Guillem Rodríguez Martínez (born 13 February 1998) is a Spanish footballer who plays as a defender for ADO Den Haag.

Career

In 2018, Rodríguez signed for Spanish fourth tier side Horta. In 2019, he signed for Real Madrid Castilla in the Spanish third tier. In 2021, he signed for Moroccan second tier club MAT. Before the second half of 2021–22, Rodríguez signed for ADO Den Haag in the Dutch second tier. On 24 April 2022, he debuted for ADO Den Haag during a 1–1 draw with Jong FC Utrecht.

References

External links

  

1998 births
ADO Den Haag players
Association football defenders
Eerste Divisie players
Expatriate footballers in Morocco
Expatriate footballers in the Netherlands
Living people
Moghreb Tétouan players
Real Madrid Castilla footballers
Tercera División players
Segunda División B players
UA Horta players
Sportspeople from Girona
Footballers from Catalonia
Spanish footballers